Park Eun-sun may refer to:
 Park Eun-sun (footballer)
 Park Eun-sun (sculptor)
 Park Eun-sun (taekwondo)